Alfredo Gourgel Pereira Melão  (21 June 1921 – 30 January 1980), is a former Portuguese footballer who played as a forward.

He was most known for his short four-year spell at Benfica, where he won one Primeira Liga and two Portuguese Cup.

Career
Born in Portugal, from Angolan parents, Melão joined Benfica in 1946, making his debut on 8 December in a match against Vitória de Guimarães. He battled with Rogério Pipi, Arsénio and Julinho for playing time, but only collected 9 appearances in his first year. In his second season, he double his playing time, and scored 11 goals, but was still behind the attacking trio in the pecking order. He won his first title in the following season, helping Benfica win the Taça de Portugal, featuring in the 1949 Taça de Portugal Final with Atlético CP. 

Melão continued to collect honours in 1949–50, winning his first league title after contributing with 6 goals in 11 matches. With another Portuguese Cup in 1950–51, Melão ended his Benfica career with 73 games and 34 goals, moving on to represent Vitória de Setúbal.

Honours
Benfica
Primeira Divisão: 1949–50 
Taça de Portugal: 1948–49, 1950–51

References
General
 

Specific

1921 births
1980 deaths
Portuguese footballers
Association football forwards
Primeira Liga players
S.L. Benfica footballers
Vitória F.C. players